The  is a Japanese video and game rating organization. It is a voluntary organization to ensure adherence to Japanese obscenity laws, which prohibit any display of genitals. This is accomplished by a mosaic pixelation applied to videos and games being sold in Japan.

History
JCRC was founded on December 1, 2010 as  after the dissolution of the Nihon Ethics of Video Association (NEVA) and the Content Soft Association (CSA).

JCRC was interviewed by the organization Human Rights Now (HRN) about its policies.

References

External links

Organizations established in 2010
Entertainment rating organizations
Organizations based in Tokyo
Shinjuku
Censorship in Japan
Media content ratings systems
Video gaming in Japan
2010 establishments in Japan